Dabangg is a Bhojpuri language free-to-air movie television channel owned by Sri Adhikari Brother Network Ltd. The channel is available across all major cable and DTH platforms as well as online.

Programs 
Bhakti Sagar
Brahma Vishnu Mahesh
Sati Savitri
Jordaar Hits
Dabangg Dopahar
Love Ke Dose Roj Roj
Bada Parda
Romaantic Ratiya

Former shows 
Bhakti Sagar
Shrimaan Shrimati
Maar Thahake
Madam Ki Paatshaala
Suraag - The Clue
Kya Samachar Hai
Alif Laila
Munni Badnam
Dil Se
Galat Family
Biwi To Biwi Saala Rey Saala
Daroga Babu
Gaana Bajaana
Paandey Ke Saamne Deshpande
Sab Golmaal Hai
Charlie Chaplin
Indian
Khauff
Comedy Champions: Laurel & Hardy
Hi Mere Bhai
Darling I Love You Two
Raasiphal
Dabangg Masala
Super Sunday
Dabangg Dumdaar Hit

References

Sri Adhikari Brothers Television
Hindi-language television channels in India
Television channels and stations established in 2013
Hindi-language television stations
Television stations in New Delhi

Movie channels in India